Andrew Thomas House, also known as Camden-Jackson Township Public Library, is a historic home located at Camden, Carroll County, Indiana.  It was built in 1869, and is a -story, transitional Greek Revival / Italianate style brick dwelling.  It measures approximately 27 feet, 6 inches, wide and 65 feet deep.  It features a full width, one-story front porch.  In 1969, the building was acquired for use as a community library.

It was listed on the National Register of Historic Places in 2003.

References

External links

Camden-Jackson Twp. Public Library website

Libraries in Indiana
Houses on the National Register of Historic Places in Indiana
Greek Revival houses in Indiana
Italianate architecture in Indiana
Houses completed in 1869
Houses in Carroll County, Indiana
National Register of Historic Places in Carroll County, Indiana
1869 establishments in Indiana